The Wheelchair Rugby League European Championship is an international wheelchair rugby league football tournament for European national teams first held in 2015 as a one off, but is planned to become a regular competition from 2023.

History
A Wheelchair Rugby League European Championship was held in 2015 as a one off competition with England winning 28–24 against France. Following the 2021 World Cup, the ERL announced plans for a Wheelchair Rugby League European Championship to be held in conjunction with the revamped Men's Rugby League European Championship and the newly formed Women's Rugby League European Championship.

Results

See also
 Men's Rugby League European Championship
 Women's Rugby League European Championship

References

European rugby league competitions
Rugby league international tournaments
Wheelchair rugby league